George Thomas  (1857 – ?) was a Welsh international footballer. He was part of the Wales national football team, playing 2 matches. He played his first match on 14 March 1885 against England and his last match on 23 March 1885 against Scotland. At club level, he played for Wrexham Olympic.

See also
 List of Wales international footballers (alphabetical)

References

1857 births
Welsh footballers
Wales international footballers
Wrexham A.F.C. players
Place of birth missing
Year of death missing
Association footballers not categorized by position